This is a list of English football transfers for the 2003 summer transfer window. Only moves featuring at least one Premier League or First Division club are listed.

The summer transfer window opened on 1 July 2003, although a few transfers took place prior to that date. Players without a club may join one at any time, either during or in between transfer windows. Clubs below Premier League level may also sign players on loan at any time. If need be, clubs may sign a goalkeeper on an emergency loan, if all others are unavailable.

Transfers

Notes

References
Transfers, May 2003
Transfers, June 2003
Transfers, July 2003
Transfers, August 2003
Transfers, September 2003

Trans
Football transfers summer 2003
Summer 2003